Neighbourhood First Policy of India, a core component of India's foreign policy, focuses on peaceful relations and collaborative synergetic co-development with its South Asian neighbors of the Indian subcontinent encompassing a diverse range of topics, such as economic, technology, research and education, connectivity (digital, surface and air transport, energy grid connectivity, logistic chains, etc), space  program, defence security, environment and climate challenge. This policy creates new avenues as well as leverages existing regional cooperation initiatives, such as SAARC, SASEC, BBIN, and 
BIMSTEC. It compliments India's Look East policy focused on Southeast Asia and Look West Policy focused on Middle East.

It was conceived by Narendra Modi as his priority, in early days of which then Foreign Minister Sushma Swaraj played an important role, was taken forward by former Foreign Secretaries and next Foreign Minister S. Jaishankar, all of these were supported by the important roles played by NSA, Ajit Doval, and several successive Foreign Secretaries.

Background

Origin of policy 

During the election campaign, before becoming the Prime Minister, Narendra Modi stated that the hinted that one of core component of his foreign policy will be neighbourhood first to foster cordial relations and synergetic economic development. and he started well by inviting all heads of state/heads of government of South Asian countries in his inauguration and on the second day on office he held bilateral talks with all of them individually which was dubbed as a mini SAARC summit by the media. Later during a launch event at ISRO he has asked Indian scientists to take the endeavour to develop a dedicated SAARC satellite to share the fruits of the technology like tele-medicine, e-learning etc. with the people across South Asia to complement the currently operating Indian Technical and Economic Cooperation Programme program in the region.

Afghanistan
The first challenge before the new govt had come from Herat, Afghanistan where the Indian consulate was attacked by the ISI backed terrorist organisation days before Modi's inauguration. Visiting the war-torn country on 10 September Swaraj called "India Afghanistan's first strategic partner". and has committed to play a greater role in capacity building by strengthening the Afghan National Army but sighed away from possibility of sending troops or direct export of military hardware from India instead according to an arrangement made earlier India would pay for purchase of arms and ammunitions from Russia.  Potential re-emergence of the Taliban and al-Qaeda in the subcontinent following NATO withdrawal from the country by end of 2014 have raised concerns among Indian security establishments. Hamid Ansari, Vice-President of India attended the inauguration ceremony of new Afghan President Ashraf Ghani and CEO Abdullah Abdullah on 29 September 2014 in Kabul and the Indian side welcomes the move of new Afghan govt to sign bilateral security agreement (BSA) with the US which will eventually pave the way for around 10,000 US soldier to remain in Afghanistan beyond 2014 NATO withdrawal.

India is also in the process of reviving an old agreement for modernising the Chabahar Port in Iran. This is to provide an alternative sea access to Afghanistan which will help further the Indian investment in the country and bilateral trade which is so far restricted by Pakistan's hostile transit policy through Karachi Port.

Bhutan
Narendra Modi made his first foreign visit to Bhutan following an invitation by King Jigme Khesar Namgyel Wangchuck and Tobgay. The visit was called by the media as a "charm offensive" that would also seek to check Bhutan-China relations that had recently been formalised. He also sought to build business ties, including a hydro-electric deal, and inaugurated the India-funded Supreme Court of Bhutan building. While talking about the visit, Modi said that Bhutan was a "natural choice" for his first foreign destination because of the "unique and special relationship" the two countries shared. He added that he was looking forward to nurture and further strengthen India's special relations with Bhutan. His entourage included Foreign Minister Sushma Swaraj, National Security Adviser Ajit Doval and Foreign Secretary Sujatha Singh. He was further set to discuss the insurgency in Northeast India, and China.

Bangladesh
There was scepticism during election campaign about Bangladeshi illegal immigrants in India which raised concern in Bangladesh but it was Prime Minister Sheikh Hasina who made a remark: "I am delighted to see a great friend of Bangladesh leading an extremely friendly country, India, in the coming days." following Modi's victory in the general election. And the new Indian govt too were quick to realize the immense geo-strategic importance of Bangladesh in India's security paradigm and therefore Foreign Minister Sushma Swaraj chose Dhaka for her first stand-alone foreign visit on 26–27 June 2014, where she met her counterpart Abul Hassan Mahmood and also called on Sheikh Hasina. Discussions were held regarding the land boundary agreement (LBA), the proposed Teesta water sharing pact, cooperation in eliminating extremist groups from North-East taking refuge in Bangladesh and illegal immigration. And taking a lesson from the previous UPA govt experience Swaraj had discussed contentious issues of Bengal with Chief Minister Mamata Banerjee before leaving for Dhaka, indicating a federal style of foreign policy.

In September 2014 at the sidelines of United Nations general assembly Modi met Bangladeshi Prime Minister Sheikh Hasina for the first time in New York City. The two leaders have discussed mechanism to stop terrorist trespassing through the porous Indo-Bangla border and the stability of democracy in Bangladesh apart from regular water sharing and land boundary issues.

Maldives
Maldivian President was one of the seven SAARC leaders to attend Modi's inauguration in Delhi. Strategically located in the Indian Ocean region Maldives plays critical role in India's maritime security architecture and being part of SAARC bilateral relations with Maldives become important as per the new neighbourhood policy. Foreign Minister Swaraj during her maiden trip to Male on 3 November 2014 held discussion with her counterpart Dunya Maumoon on bilateral and regional issues of mutual interests and also reiterated India's strong commitment towards prosperity, stability and security of Maldives. The two sides also plans to celebrate 50 years of establishment of bilateral relation.
Drinking-water crisis in Male
In the wake of a drinking water crisis in Male on 4 December 2014, following collapse of the island's only water treatment plant, Maldives urged India for immediate help. India came to rescue by sending its heavy lift transporters like C-17 Globemaster III, Il-76 carrying bottled water. The navy also sent her ships like ,  and others which can produce fresh water using their onboard desalination plants. The humanitarian relief efforts by the Indian side was widely appreciated in Male across all sections of people even the Vice-President of Maldives thanked the Indian ambassador for swift action.

Nepal

Modi chose Nepal as one of the first few countries to visit since he assumes office which signifies the importance of Nepal in the overall neighbourhood policy of the Modi govt. He visited Kathmandu on 3–4 August 2014, the first Indian PM to visit in 17 years, where he was received by the Nepalese PM himself at the airport going against protocol. The visit generated unprecedented enthusiasm among Nepali public and politicians as he addressed the constituent assembly of Nepal, first world leaders to do so, where pledged for US$1 billion line of credit to Nepal to support the infrastructure projects and said "Nepal can free India of its darkness with its electricity. But  we don't want free electricity, we want to buy it. Just by selling electricity to India, Nepal can find a place in the developed countries of the world". He also told Nepali MPs he wanted to turn India's "hostile borders benign and ultimately gateways for free trade and commerce...borders must be bridges not barriers". The Kathmandu Post reacted in writing: "Modi mantra warms Nepal's hearts." The Western medias too read it as a shift in foreign affairs for India, as well as a Nepal policy shift. The New York Times also suggested the lack of a meeting with former King Gyanendra signified that India would not support a return to monarchy despite the lack of a new constitution of Nepal. The bilateral talks were focused on reviewing the 1950s Treaty of Peace and Friendship, India-funded 'hydroelectricity projects' in Nepal and other infrastructure projects in Nepal and enhancing people-to-people contacts. The commonality of a majority Hindu heritage was also played up. He also participated in puja at the fifth century Hindu temple of Pashupatinath where he donated Rs. 25 crores and the head priest, Mool Bhatta Ganesh Bhatta, said: "I told him that we see him as a mascot for Hinduism, and appreciate his efforts in saving Hindu culture". Further he pledged not to interfere in Nepal's internal affairs (following controversy of appointment of Indian priests at a Nepali temple). Prior to Modi's visit, Swaraj made a three-day visit to Nepal from 27 July 2014 and co-chaired the Indo-Nepal Joint Commission meeting and also prepared the ground for Modi's scheduled visit. The last visit by a foreign minister of India to Nepal was made 23 years before this. Later the two sides signed the much awaited Indo-Nepal power trade agreement (PTA) which could not get signed earlier during Modi's visit due to technical problem in the draft agreement. This will allow Indian private and public sector investment in hydro power development in Nepal and future power trade and transmission to India.

To attend his maiden SAARC summit Modi visited Nepal for the second time in 2014. Where he inaugurated an India funded high tech trauma-care centre as part of a goodwill measure and also flagged-off the Kathmandu-Delhi bus service. In order to deepen ties with the Himalayan neighbour Modi presented a HAL Dhruv advanced helicopter to the Nepalese armed force in a ceremony attended by Prime Minister Sushil Koirala. He also held bilateral talks with his Nepalese counterpart in Kathmandu where two sides inked 10 agreements and memorandum of understanding including important ones regarding power trade and transmission. Once again Modi urged Nepalese law makers to adhere the January 2015 dateline for Constitution writing on the basis of consensus to accommodate views of all sections of people but this time his comments were received with mixed responses. The Nepali daily Kantipur on its editorial remarked that Narendra Modi breached diplomatic Lanshman rekha (red line) by calling it an interference in Nepal's internal matter although the English daily The Kathmandu Post described it as a well-intended advice.

Pakistan
Modi has long been considered as a hardliner nationalist against enemy forces across the border sponsoring terrorist attacks in India while he was Chief Minister of Gujarat, a state bordering Pakistan, but post-election things have changed substantially when he decided to invite Nawaz Sharif in the swearing-in ceremony. Even his strongest critics could not resist to laud this initiative, Sharif and Modi had cordial discussion on 27 May 2014 day after Modi's inauguration where the two sides agreed to look forward with Foreign Secretary level talk to start with.

But Foreign Secretary level talk scheduled on 25 August in Islamabad was called off last minute by India following Pakistani high commissioner's meeting with secessionist leaders from Jammu & Kashmir at high commission in Delhi. Which further jeopardized a potential Modi-Sharif meeting in New York at the sidelines of UNGA. Later External Affairs Minister Swaraj said that "there is no full stop in diplomacy" referring the future course of action in Indo-Pak relation. Meanwhile the two sides got engaged into an ugly gun-firing along the International border and the line of control as well with India accusing Pakistan of violating cease-fire agreement which had further damaged the already shaky bilateral ties. Later Pakistan tried to internationalize the issue by seeking United Nations intervention but the world body refused to interfere and asked the two party to settle the dispute. India accused Pakistan not following Simla Agreement where both sides agreed to resolve the Kashmir issue only through bilateral means. Now the two leaders will be in Kathmandu, Nepal to attend the 18th SAARC summit scheduled for 26–27 November. But experts anticipate the success of the upcoming summit depending upon how India and Pakistan will manage their differences.

Sri Lanka

Despite India being Sri Lanka's primary neighbour the India-Sri Lanka relations faced stagnation in the last decade due to several reasons including the large scale civilian casualties in civil war in the Tamil dominated north of the island country and a growing Chinese influence in Sri Lanka. Modi invited President Mahinda Rajapaksa to his inauguration in Delhi, overcoming domestic pressures from Tamil Nadu based political parties, in a bid to renew the ties. The primary concerns of New Delhi is the excessive Chinese investment and military presence in the island country strategically located off the South Indian coast. In fact in November 2014 a second nuclear powered Chinese submarine was allowed by the Sri Lankan authority to dock in Colombo Port despite India expressed its displeasure following a similar incident in September 2014 coinciding with the stand-off between PLA and Indian troops in the Chumar sector of Himalayas. Although later both Sri Lanka and China have clarified it as mere refueling and crew refreshment halt on the way to gulf of Aden as part of anti-piracy deployment.

Things started changing however with the 2015 presidential election where Maithripala Sirisena, an old ally and Minister in the Rajapakshe's cabinet, defeated the veteran leader to become Sri Lanka's President. There were allegation of external factors (particularly India) involved in promoting the regime change in Colombo. On 9 January 2015 even before the formal announcement of election result, Modi became the first foreign leader to call and congratulate Sirisena on his victory. Sirisena's election is expected to balance the island's tilt toward China in recent years, who had earlier proposed a foreign policy catering Indian sensitivities. Sirisena chose India for his first state visit (15–18 February) signalling a fresh-start in the bilateral relations. During Sirisena's visit to New Delhi the two countries signed a bilateral civil nuclear agreement, which is believed to be for sending a strong message towards China. They also signed three more agreements which includes a tripartite maritime cooperation pact involving Maldives. Although one irritant remained with the new administration's go ahead of a US$1.4b Chinese project for developing a 'port-city' off the Colombo harbor undermining India's security concerns.

Indian Prime Minister  visited Sri Lanka at the invitation of President  Maithripala  Sirisena and concluded his two-day official visit on Saturday 14 March 2015. Modi's visit is the first time in 28 years that an Indian prime minister has visited Sri Lanka.

See also
 List of Prime Ministerial trips made by Narendra Modi
 Look East policy (India)
 Middle Eastern foreign policy of the Narendra Modi government
 SAARC

Notes
 In 2002, Atal Bihari Vajpayee had visited Nepal but for the 11th SAARC summit held at Kathmandu.

References

Foreign relations of India
Foreign policy of the Narendra Modi administration
Narendra Modi